Ismail Rafaat (3 January 1912 – 2004) was an Egyptian football midfielder who played for Egypt in the 1934 FIFA World Cup. He also played for Zamalek SC.

References

1912 births
2004 deaths
Egyptian footballers
Egypt international footballers
Association football midfielders
Zamalek SC players
1934 FIFA World Cup players